Andrea Mist Pálsdóttir (born 25 October 1998) is an Icelandic footballer who plays as a forward for Damallsvenskan club Växjö DFF and the Iceland women's national team.

In January 2021, Andrea was loaned to Breiðablik. She appeared in one match with Breiðablik in the Icelandic League Cup on 13 February but signed with Växjö DFF a week later.

References

External links

1998 births
Living people
Andrea Mist Pálsdóttir
Women's association football forwards
Andrea Mist Pálsdóttir
Andrea Mist Pálsdóttir
Andrea Mist Pálsdóttir
Serie A (women's football) players
Andrea Mist Pálsdóttir
Andrea Mist Pálsdóttir
Andrea Mist Pálsdóttir
Expatriate women's footballers in Italy